The fimbriated moray (Gymnothorax fimbriatus), also known as dark-spotted moray or spot-face moray, is a moray eel of the family Muraenidae.

Description
Its serpentine in shape body has a white cream to light brown background color dotted with numerous black spots which latter vary in size and shape depending on the individual and maturity. Its head has a tapered snout and it is greenish-yellow with black dots, the corners of the mouth are white.

Distribution and habitat
The spot-face moray is widespread throughout the tropical waters of the Indo-Pacific area, mainly on the coastal reefs of oceanic islands from Madagascar to Polynesia and from south Japan to New Caledonia.

It lives in protected areas on the outer slopes of coral reefs, top reefs, lagoons and harbors.

Biology
The fimbriated moray is carnivorous, it leaves its lair at night to actively hunt its preys along the reef.
It feeds mainly on small fish and crustaceans.

References

External links
http://www.marinespecies.org/aphia.php?p=taxdetails&id=217499
http://www.fishbase.org/summary/6495
 

fimbriated moray
Marine fish of Northern Australia
fimbriated moray